Burlawn (meaning happy dwelling) is a hamlet in the parish of St Breock, Cornwall, England, UK.

History
There are two listed buildings in Burlawn. 1 and 2 Meadowside are late 16th century and were originally a single dwelling. Burlawn Eglos farmhouse also dates to the late 16th or early 17th century and both it and the adjacent barn are described in a single listing.

References

Hamlets in Cornwall